Berlin Station may refer to:

Berlin Station (TV series), a 2016 American television series
Berlin Operating Base, or Berlin Station, a CIA station in Berlin during the Cold War
Berlin station (Connecticut), an Amtrak and Hartford Line station in Kensington, Connecticut
Liège (Paris Métro), a Paris Métro station originally named 'Berlin'
Railway stations in Berlin, Germany
Long-a-Coming Depot, a disused station in Berlin, New Jersey

See also
Berlin (disambiguation)